The chestnut-fronted helmetshrike (Prionops scopifrons) is a species of bird in the Vanga family Vangidae, formerly usually included in the Malaconotidae.

It is found in Kenya, Mozambique, Somalia, South Africa, Tanzania, and Zimbabwe. Its natural habitats are subtropical or tropical dry forests, subtropical or tropical dry shrubland, and subtropical or tropical moist shrubland found around the equator.

References

External links
 Chestnut-fronted helmetshrike - Species text in The Atlas of Southern African Birds.

chestnut-fronted helmetshrike
Birds of East Africa
chestnut-fronted helmetshrike
chestnut-fronted helmetshrike
Taxonomy articles created by Polbot